Amjaz Rural District is a rural district (dehestan) in the Central District of Anbarabad County, Kerman Province, Iran. At the 2006 census, its population was 3,970, in 876 families. The rural district has 57 villages.

References 

Rural Districts of Kerman Province
Anbarabad County